(also known by the abbreviated name Momotetsu) is a long-running board game-style video game series in Japan; in which players travel by rail, ship, and airplane; attempting to acquire wealth through business transactions buying properties; and dealing with rival entrepreneurs and nemeses such as the . The game mechanics are often compared to the board games sugoroku and Monopoly.

Started in 1988, the series was initially produced by Hudson Soft. The rights to the series are now owned by Konami Corporation, who absorbed Hudson in 2012. This series is spin-off from another video game series by Hudson Soft, Momotaro Densetsu.

From 2004, for many years promotional marketing for the series featured the pairing of comedian Tomonori Jinnai and gravure idol/tarento Chinatsu Wakatsuki.

In June 2015, creator Akira Sakuma stated "I'm announcing here that Momotaro Dentetsu is officially done. Ishikawa at Konami squelched everything." However, in July 2015, Konami lends the license to Nintendo for an unspecified amount of money.

After seven years with no releases, a new version of the game was released, exclusive to the Nintendo 3DS. Momotaro Dentetsu II released in the US on the TurboGrafx-16 Mini.

Titles

Console games 
Its console games are as follows:

 (Famicom: 1988-12-02)
 (PC Engine: 1989-09-15, Game Boy: 1991-03-08, Famicom: 1992-03-20)
 (PC Engine: 1991-12-20, Super Famicom: 1992-08-07, Game Boy: 1994-02-18)
 (Super Famicom: 1994-12-09)
 (Sega Game Gear: 1995-12-15)
 (Super Famicom: 1995-12-08)
 (Super Famicom: 1996-12-06)
 (PlayStation: 1997-12-23)
 (Game Boy: 1998-07-31)
 (PlayStation: 1999-12-16)
 (PlayStation 2: 2001-12-13)
Momotaro Dentetsu 11: Black Bombee Arrives (PlayStation 2 & GameCube: 2002-12-05)
Momotaro Dentetsu 12: All Aboard for Western Japan! (PlayStation 2 & GameCube: 2003-12-11)
 - (PlayStation 2: 2004-11-18)
 (Game Boy Advance: 2005-06-30)
 (PlayStation 2: 2005-12-08)
 (PlayStation 2: 2006-12-07, Wii: 2007-07-19)
 (Xbox 360: 2007-12-06)
 (Nintendo DS: 2007-04-26)
 (Nintendo DS: 2008-12-18)
 (Wii: 2009-11-26)
 (PlayStation Portable: 2010-07-15)
 (Nintendo DS:2010-12-02)
Momotaro Dentetsu 2017: Tachiagare Nippon!!  (Nintendo 3DS: 2016-12-22)
Momotaro Dentetsu: Showa, Heisei, Reiwa Mo Teiban! (Nintendo Switch: 2020)
Momotaro Dentetsu World: Chikyuu wa Kibou de Mawatteru! (Nintendo Switch: TBA 2023)

Feature phone games

 (i-mode: 2005-02-07, EZweb: 2006-01-26, : 2007-04-02)
 (i-mode: 2005-11-01, EZweb: 2006-08-10, Yahoo! Keitai: 2007-04-02)
 (i-mode: 2007-01-04, EZweb: 2008-04-03)
 (i-mode: 2006-04-01, EZweb: 2007-02-01, Yahoo! Keitai: 2007-09-03)
 (i-mode: 2007-07-01)
 (i-mode: 2009-08-03)
 (i-mode: 2006-11-01, Yahoo! Keitai: 2007-09-03, EZweb: 2007-09-06)
 (i-mode: 2007-05-01, EZweb: 2008-01-31, Yahoo! Keitai: 2008-02-01)
 (i-mode: 2007-11-01, Yahoo! Keitai: 2008-09-01, EZweb: 2008-09-04)
 (i-mode: 2008-01-04)
 (i-mode: 2008-06-01, Yahoo! Keitai: 2009-02-02, EZweb: 2009-02-12)
 (i-mode: 2009-02-01)
 (i-mode: 2009-09-01)
 (i-mode: 2010-03-01)
 (i-mode:2010-11-01)
 (i-mode:2011-05-01)
 (i-mode:2012-02-01)

iOS games
 (iPhone/iPod touch: 2011-02-17)

Sales and popularity
The series is popular in Japan. Momotaro Dentetsu 7 sold over 500,000 copies in Japan. Total shipments exceeded 12 million units by 2011. To commemorate the 20th anniversary of the series, Hudson collaborated with the financially troubled Chōshi Electric Railway Line, operating a train on the railway decorated with a Momotaro Dentetsu motif. Opening on April 25, 2007, the train ran until its third anniversary. In June 2009, two Momotetsu-themed restaurants opened at Japanese railway stations: one at Haijima Station, and another at Kaminagaya Station.

References

External links
Official website

Digital board games
Hudson Soft games
Konami franchises
Nintendo Wi-Fi Connection games
Video games based on Japanese mythology
Video game franchises
Video game franchises introduced in 1988
Wii Wi-Fi games